Bebek is a Croatian  surname. Notable people with the surname include:

Ivan Bebek (born 1977), Croatian football referee
Željko Bebek (born 1945), Bosnian singer

Ancient Hungarian noble family, the  Bebek family, (sometimes referred to as Bubeks) bore this name.

See also

Bibek

Croatian surnames